Prednylidene is a glucocorticoid for systemic use.

Substitution at position 16 also leads to more potent corticosteroids. The additional steric bulk introduced by such substituents adjacent to the dihydroxyacetone side chain also protects that moiety against metabolic degradation.

References

Glucocorticoids
Vinylidene compounds